Yeats is a family name. Notable people with the name include:

 Anne Yeats (1919–2001), Irish painter and stage designer
 Elizabeth Yeats (1868–1940), Irish printer and manager of the Dun Emer Press and the Cuala Press
 Francis Yeats-Brown (1886–1944), British author of The Lives of a Bengal Lancer
 Graeme Yeats (born 1964), Australian rules footballer
 Jack Butler Yeats (1871–1957), Irish painter, stage designer, and writer
 John Butler Yeats (1839–1922), Irish artist and portrait painter
 Lily Yeats (1866–1949), Irish embroiderer active in the Arts and Crafts movement 
 Matthew Yeats (born 1979), Canadian ice hockey goaltender
 Michael Yeats (1921–2007), Irish politician
 Montague Yeats-Brown (1834-1921), British consul in Genoa and Boston
 Ron Yeats (born 1937), Scottish footballer, captain of Liverpool F.C.
 William Butler Yeats (1865–1939), Irish poet and playwright

Fictional
Frazer Yeats, a character in the soap opera Neighbours

See also
Yates (surname)
Yeates
Yeats (disambiguation)

he:ייטס (פירושונים)